Temnora namaqua is a moth of the family Sphingidae. It is known from South Africa to Tanzania.

It is similar to Temnora nitida, but the oblique band is replaced by a dark brown triangular patch on the costa that is basally edged with a pale coloration. The forewing upperside of the females is similar to the males, but the pattern is very diffuse and the elements are difficult to discern.

References

Temnora
Moths described in 1903
Moths of Africa